It's Nice to Be With You (subtitled Jim Hall in Berlin) is an album by guitarist Jim Hall which was recorded in 1969 during a European tour and released on the MPS label.

Reception

AllMusic awarded the album 3 stars and its review by Ken Dryden states "this collectible release is well worth acquiring".

Track listing
All compositions by Jim Hall except where noted.

 "Up, Up and Away" (Jimmy Webb) - 4:57
 "My Funny Valentine" (Richard Rodgers, Lorenz Hart) - 3:28
 "Young One for Debra" - 4:26
 "Blue Joe" - 4:45
 "It's Nice to Be with You" (Jane Herbert) - 4:43
 "In a Sentimental Mood" (Duke Ellington) - 5:50
 "Body and Soul" (Johnny Green, Edward Heyman, Robert Sour, Frank Eyton) - 6:21
 "Romaine" - 2:58

Personnel 
Jim Hall - guitar
Jimmy Woode - bass
Daniel Humair - drums

Trivia 
The album cover shows Jim Hall having his daughter Devra eat a bite of a bockwurst in front of a German kiosk.

References 

1969 albums
Jim Hall (musician) albums
MPS Records albums
Albums produced by Joachim-Ernst Berendt